The larger ovarian follicles consist of an external fibrovascular coat, connected with the surrounding stroma of the ovary by a network of blood vessels, and an internal coat, which consists of several layers of nucleated cells, called the membrana granulosa. It contains numerous granulosa cells.

At one part of the mature follicle the cells of the membrana granulosa are collected into a mass which projects into the cavity of the follicle. This is termed the discus proligerus.

References

External links
  - "Female Reproductive System: ovary, cumulus oophorus"
  - "Female Reproductive System: ovary, membrana granulosa"
  
 Description at okstate.edu

Mammal female reproductive system